Kondaia or Kondaea or Condaea was a city and polis (city-state) in the district of Pelasgiotis of ancient Thessaly.

It is mentioned by Herodotus as the birthplace of Cineas, king of Thessaly who sent a thousand horsemen in aid of the Peisistratids of Athens in the face of an attack by the Spartans, at the end of the sixth century BCE.

Its location is doubtful. A settlement near the current Falani and another near Bakrina, two places of Pelasgiotis have been suggested as possible sites of the city, with the Bakrina location the more likely candidate.

References

Cities in ancient Greece
Populated places in ancient Thessaly
Former populated places in Greece
Pelasgiotis
Thessalian city-states